Bulgan is one of the 21 aimags (provinces) of Mongolia, located in northern Mongolia. Its capital is also named Bulgan.

Geography 
The aimag is surrounded by Russia (Buryatia) in the north, the aimags Khövsgöl in the northwest, Arkhangai in the southwest, Övörkhangai in the south, Töv in the southeast, and Selenge in the northeast. The small Orkhon Aimag forms an enclave at the border to Selenge.

The north of the aimag is characterized by alpine forests, gradually blending in the arid steppe plains of the central Mongolian highland. The main rivers are the Orkhon and the Selenge, first of which enter the aimag from Övörkhangai while the second is enters from Khövsgöl Province. As a result, southern and central Bulgan is one of Mongolia's few arable regions.

Transportation 
The Bulgan Airport (UGA/ZMBN) has one unpaved runway and is served by regular flights to Ulaanbaatar, Khovd, and Mörön.

Administrative subdivisions 

* - The aimag capital Bulgan city.

** - data includes Khyalganat urban-type settlement (3,300 pop.), 25 km North from the Khangal sum centre

*** - data includes Saikhan-Ovoo urban-type settlement (500 pop.), 25 km North-West from the Saikhan sum centre

References

External links 

 
Provinces of Mongolia
States and territories established in 1938
1938 establishments in Mongolia